Estonian Volleyball Championships are the national volleyball championships held since 1925 in Estonia.

Medalists

See also
Baltic Men Volleyball League
Estonian Women's Volleyball Championships

References

External links
Official website 

National championships in Estonia
Volleyball in Estonia
Men's volleyball leagues
National volleyball leagues
Sports leagues established in 1925
1925 establishments in Estonia